Victor Sadler (1937–2020) was a British-born Dutch Esperantist.

Sadler and Esperanto 
Victor Sadler learnt Esperanto when he was 14, in 1951.

After his graduation in phonetics, in 1962, at the end of that year he started working at the central office of the World Esperanto Association (UEA), in Rotterdam (Netherlands), where he cared after the magazine Esperanto. He also served as redactor of Monda Kulturo, during the short lifespan of this other periodical, and he cared after the Hector Hodler library, which is still nowadays one of the richest Esperanto libraries in the world.

In 1968 he followed Marianne H. Vermaas as the General Director of the World Esperanto Association. Akiko Uxusink-Nagata helped him write the magazine until 1970; in 1974 the task was definitively taken over by a new redactor, Simo Milojeviĉ.

In this period, Sadler also cared after the organization of several World Congresses of Esperanto. He resigned in 1983.

Sadler wrote literary works in Esperanto as well; in 1968 he received the award Arĝenta Sprono thanks to his collection of poems Memkritiko ("selfcritics"), although the preface to the work says that it was originally a manuscript that he found in the library.

In 1986 he was elected a member of the steering council of UEA, responsible for finances; nevertheless he had to resign in March 1987 because of health reasons.

Sadler also served as a member of the Esperanto Academy, the organization which groups the most prominent Esperanto linguists and cares after the evolution of the language.

References

1937 births
2020 deaths
British Esperantists
Dutch Esperantists
Akademio de Esperanto members
Writers of Esperanto literature
British emigrants to the Netherlands